PSLV-C35 was the successful mission of the Polar Satellite Launch Vehicle program which set eight satellites in space. It was launched on 26 September 2016 by Indian Space Research Organisation (ISRO) from the Satish Dhawan Space Centre at Sriharikota.

Launch
PSLV-C35 was launched at 03:42 hours Coordinated Universal Time (09:12 hours Indian Standard Time) on 26 September 2016 from the first launch pad of Satish Dhawan Space Centre at Sriharikota in the Indian state of Andhra Pradesh.

Mission highlights
PSLV-C35 was the 37th launch of the PSLV program. It was also the 102nd overall launch by Indian Space Research Organisation. PSLV-C35 was the first spaceflight by ISRO to place satellites in two different orbits with a single rocket. It carried and injected eight satellites built by India, Algeria, Canada and United States.

Mission parameters
 Mass:
 Total liftoff weight: 
 Payload weight: 
 Overall height: 
 Propellant:
 First stage: Solid HTPB based (138.2 + 6 x 8.9 tonnes)
 Second stage: Liquid UH 25 +  (42 tonnes)
 Third stage: Solid HTPB based (7.6 tonnes)
 Fourth stage: Liquid MMH + MON-3 (2.5 tonnes)
 Engine:
 First stage: Core (PS 1) + 6 strap-on PSOM
 Second stage: Vikas
 Third stage: PS 3
 Fourth stage: PS 4
 Thrust:
 First stage: 4,762 + 645 x 6 kN
 Second stage: 800 kN
 Third stage: 246 kN
 Fourth stage: 7.3 x 2 kN
 Maximum altitude: 
 Maximum velocity: (recorded at time of PS-4 engine restart 2)
 Duration: 8,133 seconds

Payload
PSLV-C35 carried and deployed eight satellites in two different orbits in a single mission (Polar and Sun-synchronous orbit). This was the first time India had placed satellites in two orbits in a single mission. The vehicle carried three satellites from India (ScatSat-1, PISat & Pratham), three satellites from Algeria (Alsat-1B, 2B & 1N), one each from Canada (NLS-19) and the United States (Pathfinder-1).

See also
 Indian Space Research Organisation
 Polar Satellite Launch Vehicle

References 

Spacecraft launched by India in 2016
Polar Satellite Launch Vehicle